Hubert Fehr (born ca. 1970) is a German archaeologist. Fehr received his studied history, Roman archaeology and Medieval history at the University of Freiburg from 1991 to 1998. With financial support from the European Union, Fehr gained his PhD in 2003 with a thesis on relationships between the Germanic peoples and Romans under the Merovingian dynasty. His thesis was published as a supplement to the Reallexikon der Germanischen Altertumskunde.

Selected works
 Germanen und Romanen im Merowingerreich, 2010

See also
 Sebastian Brather
 Heiko Steuer

Sources
 

1970 births
German archaeologists
German medievalists
Living people
University of Freiburg alumni